Borstal Institution & Juvenile Jail Bahawalpur is the Old Central Jail situated near Fareed Gate in Bahawalpur, Pakistan.

History
The jail was built in 1882 as a Central Jail. It was constructed with a view to confine long-term and life prisoners of Bahawalpur Division. After construction of New Central Jail Bahawalpur, it was declared as Borstal Institution & Juvenile Jail for confinement of juveniles.

Prison industries

The following prison industries had been functioning in the jail in the past. to train the juvenile convicts in various trades and handicrafts so that they could earn their living after release form Jail, utilise prison labour in profitable works for benefit of state exchequer, and keep the juveniles busy in useful tasks.

 Jail Warder Uniform Tailoring / Stitching Unit
 Jail Warder Jersey Knitting Unit
 Carpet Knitting Unit
 Phenyle Manufacturing Unit

After promulgation of Juvenile Justice System Ordinance 2000, the prison labour in this juvenile jail has been terminated.

See also

 Government of Punjab, Pakistan
 Punjab Prisons (Pakistan)
 Prison Officer
 Headquarter Jail
 National Academy for Prisons Administration
 Punjab Prisons Staff Training Institute

References

External links
 Official Website of Punjab Prisons (Pakistan)

Prisons in Pakistan
Buildings and structures in Bahawalpur